(born March 9, 1970 in Kagoshima) is a retired male boxer from Japan. He represented his native country at the 1996 Summer Olympics in Atlanta, Georgia, where he lost in the second round of the men's middleweight division (– 75 kg) by Thailand's  Thamwisai Wangsomnuk.

References
sports-reference

1970 births
Living people
People from Kagoshima
Middleweight boxers
Boxers at the 1996 Summer Olympics
Olympic boxers of Japan
Sportspeople from Kagoshima Prefecture
Boxers at the 1994 Asian Games
Japanese male boxers
Asian Games competitors for Japan
20th-century Japanese people